State Route 383 (SR 383) is a  north south state highway in the central portion of the U.S. state of Ohio. County Road 60 (CR 60, Old Somerset Road) picks up where SR 383 leaves off heading southeast from the church entrance.

Route description

All of SR 383 is situated within Reading Township in northern Perry County. SR 383 travels in a northwesterly direction amid primarily open fields, with some trees and houses also appearing alongside the highway for its entire length. It intersects CR 45 (Big Inch Road) en route to its endpoint at a T-intersection with SR 13.

This state route is not included as a part of the National Highway System.

History
SR 383 was created in 1935.  The highway has served as a spur route off of SR 13 southeast of Somerset throughout its entire history.  Originally an earth-surfaced highway, SR 383 was paved by 1942.

Major intersections

References

383
383